Vyacheslav Shapovalov is a Ukrainian government official. He was the deputy defense minister of Ukraine.

References

Ukrainian politicians

Living people

Year of birth missing (living people)
Place of birth missing (living people)